Francisc Joel Martínez Vilar (born 31 December 1988) is an Andorran footballer who plays as a midfielder for FC Ordino.

Club career
Martínez's senior career began with UE Sant Julià in 2005, remaining with the Primera Divisió team until 2006 when the midfielder agreed to join Andorran-based Spanish Tercera Catalana side FC Andorra. Martínez spent the 2007–08 Primera Divisió season back with Sant Julià, prior to returning to Spain with FC Andorra for the following campaign. This spell with the club lasted five years, with Martínez netting twelve goals in one hundred and twenty-six appearances. He rejoined Sant Julià for a third time in 2013, subsequently winning the Copa Constitució in his sole season there. Martínez spent the next three years with FC Santa Coloma.

After winning the league title in every season with FC Santa Coloma, Martínez was signed by fellow top-flight team Inter d'Escaldes in 2017. Six matches and one goal followed. Martínez returned to FC Andorra in 2018, with the club now in Primera Catalana. In mid-2019, Martínez returned to Andorra with FC Ordino. He appeared fifteen times in 2019–20 as they suffered relegation.

International career
Martínez was called up by Andorra in 2007. He made his debut on 28 March during a UEFA Euro 2008 qualifier with England, with his nation losing 0–3 at the Estadi Olímpic Lluís Companys; he was subbed on for Manolo Jiménez Soria after sixty-nine minutes.

Career statistics
.

Honours
UE Sant Julià
Copa Constitució: 2014

FC Santa Coloma
Primera Divisió (3): 2014–15, 2015–16, 2016–17

References

External links

1988 births
Living people
Place of birth missing (living people)
Andorran footballers
Andorra international footballers
Association football midfielders
Andorran expatriate footballers
Expatriate footballers in Spain
Andorran expatriate sportspeople in Spain
Primera Divisió players
Primera Catalana players
UE Sant Julià players
FC Andorra players
FC Santa Coloma players
Inter Club d'Escaldes players
FC Ordino players